The highest-selling albums and EPs in the United States are ranked in the Billboard 200, which is published by Billboard magazine. The data are compiled by Nielsen Soundscan based on each album's weekly physical and digital sales. In 1987, a total 9 albums reached the number one position.

The beginning of the year started with the continuation of the end of last year's number one album, Live 1975-85 by Bruce Springsteen, but was quickly overtaken by Bon Jovi, and Slippery When Wet, which returned to the top spot, and became their first number one album.  Whitney Houston scored her second #1 with Whitney, which had the longest run among the releases, spending 11 consecutive weeks at the top. The album became the first by a female artist ever to debut at #1 in the Billboard 200, and produced a then-record-equaling four #1 singles from one album; which was broken two months later when Michael Jackson's Bad produced five number ones. Whitney is one of only nine albums in music history to produce at least four #1 Hot 100 hits from the same album. Both U2 and Beastie Boys gained their first number one albums, with The Joshua Tree, and Licensed to Ill.

Chart history

See also
 1987 in music
 List of number-one albums (United States)
 List of best-selling albums
 List of best-selling albums in the United States

References

1987
1987 record charts